The Japan Women's National Wheelchair Basketball Team is the wheelchair basketball side that represents Japan in international competitions for women as part of the International Wheelchair Basketball Federation.

Current roster
The following 12 players named for the Wheelchair basketball at the 2020 Summer Paralympics – Women's tournament.

Head coach: Yoshiaki Iwasa

Competitions

Wheelchair Basketball World Championship

Summer Paralympics
Japan has entered a wheelchair basketball team into the Summer Paralympics since 1984, when it won bronze defeating Canada, until 2008.

See also
Japan men's national wheelchair basketball team

References

National women's wheelchair basketball teams
National mens
W